The 1995 Brisbane Broncos season was the eighth in the club's history. They competed in the Australian Rugby League's 1995 Winfield Cup premiership, finishing in the regular season 3rd (out of 20) and making it to the semi-finals before being knocked out by eventual premiers, the Sydney Bulldogs.

Season summary 
The team was hoping to avenge their on-field disappointment of 1994. They started perfectly, winning the final of the Tooheys Cup against Cronulla and then their first seven premiership matches in their best start ever. But a 26-0 humiliation against Canberra sent the Broncos on another tumble that saw them lose four matches in five weeks. Despite being free of State of Origin representative duties due to their affiliation with Super League, the Broncos had again faltered mid-season, but went on to win their last 6 matches of the regular season.

In the finals though, the Broncos suffered close defeats at the hands of defending Premiers Canberra and eventual 1995 winners the Canterbury Bulldogs. An injury to Allan Langer resulted in crucial missed tackles in both matches by the Brisbane skipper, and played a contributing factor in the Broncos' failure to win.

Match results

Season Ladder

Scorers

Honours

League 
 Nil

Club 
 Player of the year: Allan Langer
 Rookie of the year: Darren Lockyer
 Back of the year: Allan Langer
 Forward of the year: Glenn Lazarus
 Club man of the year: Chris Johns

References

See also 
 Australian Rugby League season 1995
 History of the Brisbane Broncos

Brisbane Broncos seasons
Brisbane Broncos season